Oscar Olsen (23 September 1908 – 4 December 2004) was a Norwegian politician for the Liberal Party.

He was elected to the Norwegian Parliament from the Market towns of Vest-Agder and Rogaland counties in 1945, but was not re-elected in 1949. Instead he served as a deputy representative during the terms 1950–1953 and 1961–1965.

Olsen was born in Kristiansand and was a member of the Kristiansand municipality council from 1947 to 1963 and 1975 to 1979, and served as mayor 
in the period 1963–1966.

References

1908 births
2004 deaths
Liberal Party (Norway) politicians
Politicians from Kristiansand
Members of the Storting
20th-century Norwegian politicians